The Allen Steinheim Museum is a historic building and former museum located on the campus of Alfred University at Alfred in Allegany County, New York.  It is a crenellated stone structure built from 1876 to 1880 to house the "mineral, geological, natural, and man-made curiosities" of Alfred University's second president Jonathan Allen. The building was originally started by Professor Ida Kenyon, who wished to make a private residence that resembled the castles of her native Germany.  The building is constructed of over 8,000 rock specimens that were combined to form the walls of the structure and 700 samples of local and foreign wood to combine the internal framework.  When operating in the 1930s, it was considered the second oldest college museum in the United States. The Federal Writers Project described the museum as exhibiting a unique collection of "rare shells, mounted birds and animals, Indian artifacts and pioneer agricultural implements, early American pottery, Steigel and Sandwich glass, and the finest workmanship in the ceramic arts".  The building ceased being used as a museum in the early 1950s, was used as classroom space, and then fell into disrepair.

After a 1995 renovation and a 1997 dedication, the Steinheim, which is German for "stone house," has since housed the Robert R. McComsey Career Development Center.

In 2008 artist Lenka Clayton devoted time to several projects that sought to call attention to the Steinheim Museum's absent collection.  Among these projects were: ""7,000 Stones," that collected a symbolic pile of stones- numbered as if part of a collection- which were then discarded; "Found Instructions 1", that used an inventory sheet of the dying collection- found in the university's Special Collections- to create a modern display;  and  "Amnesty for the Museum," where she put a call out for the missing artifacts of the collection in order to photograph them in their current environment.

It was listed on the National Register of Historic Places in 1973.

References

External links
Alfred University - Robert R. McComsey Career Development Center at the Allen Steinheim Museum
Shoe Collection from the Steinheim Museum, Special Collections, Herrick Memorial Library

Alfred University
Museums on the National Register of Historic Places in New York (state)
Defunct museums in New York (state)
Infrastructure completed in 1880
Buildings and structures in Allegany County, New York
National Register of Historic Places in Allegany County, New York
1880 establishments in New York (state)